USS Manito II (SP-262) was a United States Navy patrol vessel in commission from 1917 to ca. 1919.

Manito II was built as a civilian wooden-hulled motor yacht of the same name in 1912 by the Hudson Yacht and Boat Company at Nyack, New York. The U.S. Navy purchased her from her owner, Mr. I. K. Keyward, on 10 May 1917 for World War I service as a patrol vessel. She was commissioned the same day as USS Manito II (SP-262).

Assigned to the 6th Naval District, Manito II operated on section patrol based at Charleston, South Carolina, for the rest of World War I.

Manito II was sold on 25 March 1920.

References

Department of the Navy: Navy History and Heritage Command: Online Library of Selected Images: U.S. Navy Ships: USS Manito II (SP-262), 1917-1920. Previously civilian motor yacht Manito II (1912)
NavSource Online: Section Patrol Craft Photo Archive: Manito II (SP 262)

Patrol vessels of the United States Navy
World War I patrol vessels of the United States
Individual yachts
Ships built in Nyack, New York
1912 ships